The 1991–92 Winnipeg Jets season was the Jets' 20th season, their 13th in the National Hockey League (NHL). The Jets placed fourth in the Smythe Division and qualified for the 1992 Stanley Cup playoffs, where they lost the Division Semi-final to the Vancouver Canucks, four games to three.

Offseason
On June 17, 1991, the Jets introduced John Paddock as the new head coach of the team, as Bob Murdoch was not brought back after Winnipeg failed to qualify for the 1991 Stanley Cup playoffs. This would be Paddock's first head coaching job in the NHL, although he had six years of head coaching experience in the American Hockey League (AHL) and had led the Hershey Bears to the 1988 Calder Cup. Paddock was the head coach of the Binghamton Rangers in the 1990–91 season, leading the team to a 44–30–6 record.

With the fifth overall pick at the 1991 NHL Entry Draft held on June 22, 1991, the Jets selected defenceman Aaron Ward from the University of Michigan. In 46 games, Ward had 8 goals and 19 points. Some other notable picks that Winnipeg made were Juha Ylönen in the fifth round and Igor Ulanov in the tenth round.

On July 22, 1991, the Jets acquired Troy Murray and Warren Rychel from the Chicago Blackhawks in exchange for Bryan Marchment and Chris Norton. Murray was coming off a 14-goal, 37-point season in 75 games with the Blackhawks in 1990–91, and would be named the captain of the Jets for 1991–92. Rychel spent the 1990–91 season with the Indianapolis Ice of the AHL, recording 33 goals and 63 points in 68 games, as well as 338 penalty minutes.

The Smythe Division added a sixth team for the 1991–92 season, as the expansion team San Jose Sharks joined the division.

Troy Murray was named captain, replacing Randy Carlyle and Thomas Steen.

Regular season
The Jets finished the regular season third in goaltending, allowing only 244 goals. They also tied the Montreal Canadiens for the most shutouts, with 7.

Final standings

Schedule and results

Playoffs
The Jets lost to the Vancouver Canucks in seven games, in the Division semi-finals.

Player statistics

Regular season
Scoring

Goaltending

Playoffs
Scoring

Goaltending

Awards and records

Transactions

Trades

Waivers

Free agents

|}

Draft picks
Winnipeg's draft picks at the 1991 NHL Entry Draft held at the Buffalo Memorial Auditorium in Buffalo, New York.

Farm teams

See also
 1991–92 NHL season

References

External links

Winnipeg Jets season, 1991-92
Winnipeg Jets (1972–1996) seasons
Winn